Sjur Larsson Helgeland (19 August 1858 − 12 April 1924) was a Norwegian hardingfele fiddler and composer.

Biography
He was born at Voss in Hordaland, Norway.  His parents were Lars  Olsson Hirt (1823-1908) and Brita Helgeland (1820-98). He grew up in the rural valley  of  Myrkdalen in the parish of  Vossestrand.
He received musical training from local  Hardanger fiddle players including Ola Mosafinn  (1828–1912).
In 1896, he won the first annual Norwegian folk music and dance competition  (Vest landskappleiken) conducted at Bergen.

Among his best-known airs is Budeiene på Vikafjell, a composition reflecting the different moods of three dairymaids; sorrow, joy and happiness, combined with cattle call, lows, wind and bird singing. 

Helgeland died  in 1924 and was buried at Vinje Church (Vinje kyrkje). A stone memorial to Sjur Helgeland was raised in his home village during 1958.

References

Norwegian traditional musicians
Norwegian fiddlers
Male violinists
Norwegian composers
Norwegian male composers
Musicians from Voss
1858 births
1924 deaths